The Weatherby PA-08 is a 12 gauge  pump action shotgun marketed by Weatherby Inc. The shotgun is economically priced and constitutes the low end of products marketed by Weatherby. The PA-08 is manufactured in Turkey for Weatherby.

Weatherby markets three versions of the shotgun, an Upland version which has walnut furniture, the Synthetic which features an injected-molded lightweight stock and the PA-08 TR (Threat Response) which sports a similar stock as the Synthetic. The PA-08 TR is marketed as a home defense shotgun and has a  barrel. All versions of these shotguns can handle both  or  12 gauge shells.

Weatherby also markets the SA-08, a semi-automatic version of this firearm.

Pump-action shotguns